The 356th Airlift Squadron is a United States Air Force Reserve squadron, assigned to the 433d Operations Group Air Force Reserve Command, stationed at Kelly Field Annex, Joint Base San Antonio, Texas. The 356th is a C-5M Super Galaxy Formal Training Unit.

The squadron was first activated in 1942 as the 356th Bombardment Squadron, and served as a training unit until the spring of 1944, when it was inactivated in a reorganization of training units by the Army Air Forces.  It was activated again as a Boeing B-29 Superfortress unit.  It deployed to the Pacific in the spring of 1945 and participated in the strategic bombing campaign against Japan, earning a Distinguished Unit Citation.  After V-J Day, the squadron remained in the Pacific until 1946, when it was inactivated.

The squadron was redesignated the 356th Troop Carrier Squadron and activated in the military reserve force in 1949, but was inactivated a few months later.  When the reserves resumed flying operations after the Korean War, the squadron was activated again in 1952.  It served continuously in the reserve until 2006, being mobilized during the Cuban Missile Crisis.  It was activated in its current role in 2007.

Mission
The squadron operates the Air Force Reserve's only Formal Training Unit providing initial and advanced C-5 flight qualification for Air Mobility Command, Air National Guard and Air Force Reserve Command aircrews.

History

World War II

Bombardment training unit
Constituted 356 Bombardment Squadron (Heavy) on 28 January 1942. Activated with B-24 bombers on 1 June 1942 at Geiger Field, WA. Moved to; Davis-Monthan Field, AZ, 23 Jun 1942 and trained aircrews for bombardment missions. Relocated to Wendover Field, UT, 30 Jul 1942; Pueblo AAB, CO, 30 Sep 1942; Davis-Monthan Field, AZ, 1 Dec 1942; Clovis, NM, 29 Jan 1943; Langley Field, VA, 17 Dec 1943 & Chatham AAFld, GA, 27 Jan-10 Apr 1944. Operating B-17, 1944; B-29, 1945-1946. Inactivated on 10 April 1944.

Combat in the Pacific
Redesignated as a Boeing B-29 Superfortress very heavy bombardment Squadron under Second Air Force on 7 April 1944 at Dalhart Army Air Field, Texas. Initially equipped with Boeing B-17 Flying Fortresses for training, due to shortage of B-29 Superfortresses. Moved to McCook Army Air Field, Nebraska, in August 1944 and equipped with B-29B limited production aircraft.

After completion of training deployed to Central Pacific Area, assigned to XXI Bomber Command, Northwest Field (Guam) for operational missions.  B-29Bs were standard production aircraft stripped of most defensive guns to increase speed and bomb load, The tail gun was aimed and fired automatically by the new AN/APG-15B radar fire control system that detected the approaching enemy plane and made all the necessary calculations.

Mission of the squadron was the strategic bombardment of the Japanese Home Islands.  Entered combat on 16 June 1945 with a bombing raid against an airfield on Moen. Flew first mission against the Japanese home islands on 26 June 1945 and afterwards operated principally against the enemy's petroleum industry.  Flew primarily low-level, fast attacks at night using a mixture of high-explosive and incendiary bombs to attack targets.

Flew last combat mission on 15 August 1945, later flew in "Show of Force" mission on 2 September 1945 over Tokyo Bay during formal Japanese Surrender. Inactivated on Guam 15 April 1946, personnel returned to the United States and aircraft sent to storage in Southwest United States.

Reserve operations
It trained for Douglas C-54 Skymaster airlift operations from 1949–1950 and for troop carrier missions from 1952–1967.  The squadron airlifted troops and their equipment during the Cuban Missile Crisis, October–November 1962.  From 1970–1971 the squadron trained for special operations.

Between 1971 and 2006 it trained for and flew airlift missions, participating in exercises, supporting unit deployments, taking part in special assignment airlift missions, and rotating periodically to Panama.  The 356th supported liberation of Kuwait in 1991.  It converted from tactical to strategic aircraft and was renamed 356 Airlift Squadron in 1992. Operating C-141 Starlifters between 1992-2006 and provided strategic airlift until 30 June 2006 when the squadron was inactivated. Activated in the Reserve on 9 January 2007.

Since 2007 the 356th has conducted air crew training for the Lockheed C-5 Galaxy. The final C-5A Galaxy aircraft (tail number 70-0448) departed Kelly Field on September 28, 2016. The first of the eight Lockheed Martin C-5M Super Galaxy aircraft, arrived June 2016.

Operations and decorations
 Combat Operations: Combat in Western Pacific, 23 Jun-14 Aug 1945. Airlifted troops and their equipment during the Cuban missile crisis, Oct–Nov 1962. Vietnam War; Supported liberation of Kuwait in 1991.
 Campaigns: Air Offensive, Japan; Eastern Mandates; Western Pacific. Southwest Asia: Liberation and Defense of Kuwait; Operation Desert Shield
 Decorations: Distinguished Unit Citation, Japan 6–13 Jul 1945 Air Force Outstanding Unit Award: 1 Jan 1977 – 31 Dec 1978; 1 Oct 1999 – 30 Sep 2001. Republic of Vietnam Gallantry Cross with Palm, 14 Feb-11 Mar 1968.

Lineage
 Constituted as the 356 Bombardment Squadron (Heavy) on 28 January 1942
 Activated on 1 June 1942
 Inactivated on 10 April 1944
 Redesignated 356 Bombardment Squadron, Very Heavy on 27 June 1944
 Activated on 7 July 1944
 Inactivated on 15 April 1946
 Redesignated 356 Troop Carrier Squadron, Medium on 16 May 1949
 Activated in the reserve on 27 June 1949
 Inactivated on 28 January 1950
 Activated in the reserve on 14 June 1952
 Ordered to active service on 28 October 1962
 Relieved from active service on 28 November 1962
 Redesignated 356 Tactical Airlift Squadron on 1 July 1967
 Redesignated 356 Special Operations Squadron on 25 June 1970
 Redesignated 356 Tactical Airlift Squadron on 26 July 1971
 Redesignated 356 Airlift Squadron on 1 February 1992
 Inactivated on 30 June 2006
 Activated in the reserve on 9 January 2007

Assignments
 302d Bombardment Group, 1 June 1942 – 10 April 1944
 331st Bombardment Group, 7 July 1944 – 15 April 1946
 302d Troop Carrier Group, 27 June 1949 – 28 January 1950
 302d Troop Carrier Group, 14 June 1952
 302d Troop Carrier Wing, 14 April 1959
 907th Troop Carrier Group (later 907th Tactical Airlift Group, 907th Special Operations Group, 907th Tactical Airlift Group), 11 February 1963
 302d Tactical Airlift Wing, 1 September 1975
 907th Tactical Airlift Group (later 907 Airlift Group), 1 April 1981
 907th Operations Group, 1 August 1992
 445th Operations Group, 1 October 1994 – 30 June 2006
 433d Operations Group, 9 January 2007– present

Bases stationed

 Geiger Field, Washington, 1 June 1942
 Davis–Monthan Field, Arizona, 23 June 1942
 Wendover Field, Utah, 30 July 1942
 Pueblo Army Air Base, Colorado, 30 September 1942
 Davis–Monthan Field, Arizona, 1 December 1942
 Clovis Army Air Field, New Mexico, 29 January 1943
 Langley Field, Virginia, 17 December 1943
 Chatham Army Air Field, Georgia, 27 January–10 April 1944

 Dalhart Army Air Field, Texas, 7 July 1944
 McCook Army Air Field, Nebraska, 22 November 1944 – 8 April 1945
 Northwest Field (Guam), Mariana Islands, 12 May 1945 – 15 April 1946
 McChord Air Force Base, Washington, 27 June 1949 – 28 January 1950
 Clinton County Air Force Base, Ohio, 14 June 1952
 Lockbourne Air Force Base (later Rickenbacker Air Force Base, Rickenbacker Air National Guard Base), Ohio, 26 July 1971
 Wright-Patterson Air Force Base, Ohio, 1 April 1993 – 30 June 2006
 Lackland Air Force Base, Texas, 9 January 2007 – present

Aircraft

 Consolidated B-24 Liberator (1942–1944)
 Boeing B-17 Flying Fortress (1944)
 Boeing B-29B Superfortress (1945–1946)
 Douglas C-54 Skymaster (1949–1950)
 Curtiss C-46 Commando (1952–1957)
 Fairchild C-119 Flying Boxcar (1956–1973)

 Fairchild C-123 Provider (1972–1981)
 Lockheed C-130 Hercules (1981–1992)
 Lockheed C-141 Starlifter (1992–2006)
 Lockheed C-5 Galaxy (2007–2016)
 Lockheed C-5M Super Galaxy (2016 - Present)

References

Notes
 Explanatory notes

 Citations

Bibliography

External links
356th Airlift Squadron Fact Page

Military units and formations in Texas
356